Orgilus is a genus of insects belonging to the family Braconidae.

The genus has almost cosmopolitan distribution.

Species

 Orgilus abbreviator (Ratzeburg, 1852)
 Orgilus ablusus Muesebeck, 1970
 Orgilus absonus Muesebeck, 1970
 Orgilus achterbergi Taeger, 1989
 Orgilus affinis Taeger, 1991
 Orgilus agrestis Muesebeck, 1970
 Orgilus alacer Muesebeck, 1970
 Orgilus alboannulatus van Achterberg, 2000
 Orgilus albosignatus van Achterberg, 1987
 Orgilus amplissimus Chou, 1995
 Orgilus amyrossmanae Sharkey, 2021
 Orgilus anthracinus Muesebeck, 1970
 Orgilus anurus Thomson, 1895
 Orgilus apostolicus Turner, 1922
 Orgilus arcticus Muesebeck, 1970
 Orgilus ashmeadii (Brues, 1933)
 Orgilus asper Taeger, 1989
 Orgilus asperrimus Taeger, 1989
 Orgilus austroussuricus Belokobylskij, 1998
 Orgilus balcanicus Taeger, 1989
 Orgilus balsameae Muesebeck, 1970
 Orgilus bifasciatus Turner, 1922
 Orgilus boharti Muesebeck, 1970
 Orgilus bohayicus Belokobylskij & Taeger, 1996
 Orgilus brevicaudatus van Achterberg, 2000
 Orgilus brevicaudis Taeger, 1989
 Orgilus brevipalpis Taeger, 1991
 Orgilus buccatus Muesebeck, 1970
 Orgilus burksi Muesebeck, 1970
 Orgilus caballus Chou, 1995
 Orgilus californicus (Provancher, 1888)
 Orgilus caliginosus Taeger, 1989
 Orgilus capeki Taeger, 1989
 Orgilus capsicola Muesebeck, 1970
 Orgilus caritus Chou, 1995
 Orgilus carrolyoonae Sharkey, 2021
 Orgilus caudatus Granger, 1949
 Orgilus cerinus Muesebeck, 1970
 Orgilus chankaicus Belokobylskij & Taeger, 1998
 Orgilus christhompsoni Sharkey, 2021
 Orgilus christinemcmahonae Sharkey, 2021
 Orgilus cincticornis Granger, 1949
 Orgilus cinctus Muesebeck, 1970
 Orgilus cingulatus Granger, 1949
 Orgilus citus Muesebeck, 1970
 Orgilus claripennis Ivanov, 1899
 Orgilus clivicola Muesebeck, 1970
 Orgilus cognatus Muesebeck, 1970
 Orgilus coleophorae Muesebeck, 1970
 Orgilus coloradensis Muesebeck, 1970
 Orgilus columbianus (Enderlein, 1912)
 Orgilus compactus Muesebeck, 1970
 Orgilus comptanae Muesebeck, 1970
 Orgilus conflictanae Muesebeck, 1970
 Orgilus consuetus Muesebeck, 1970
 Orgilus coracinus Muesebeck, 1970
 Orgilus coreanus Taeger, 1987
 Orgilus coriaceus Granger, 1949
 Orgilus coxalis Taeger, 1989
 Orgilus cretus Chou, 1995
 Orgilus cristatus Muesebeck, 1970
 Orgilus cunctus Chou, 1995
 Orgilus cuneatus (Provancher, 1888)
 Orgilus detectiformis Viereck, 1917
 Orgilus detectus Provancher, 1886
 Orgilus dianalipscombae Sharkey, 2021
 Orgilus dilleri Beyarslan, 1996
 Orgilus dioryctriae Gahan, 1919
 Orgilus discrepans Muesebeck, 1970
 Orgilus discretus Taeger, 1989
 Orgilus disparilis Muesebeck, 1970
 Orgilus dissidens Muesebeck, 1970
 Orgilus distinguendus Taeger, 1991
 Orgilus dolosus Muesebeck, 1970
 Orgilus dorni Taeger, 1989
 Orgilus dovnari Tobias, 1986
 Orgilus dreisbachi Muesebeck, 1970
 Orgilus dubius Taeger, 1989
 Orgilus ebbenielsoni Sharkey, 2021
 Orgilus ejuncidus Muesebeck, 1970
 Orgilus elasmopalpi Muesebeck, 1970
 Orgilus elizabethpennisiae Sharkey, 2021
 Orgilus elongatus Papp, 1971
 Orgilus eous Belokobylskij & Taeger, 1996
 Orgilus erythropus Muesebeck, 1970
 Orgilus evertlindquisti Sharkey, 2021
 Orgilus excellens Taeger, 1989
 Orgilus exilis Muesebeck, 1970
 Orgilus facialis Tobias, 1964
 Orgilus fallax Muesebeck, 1970
 Orgilus femoralis Muesebeck, 1970
 Orgilus ferus Muesebeck, 1970
 Orgilus festivus Papp, 1975
 Orgilus fictus Muesebeck, 1970
 Orgilus fischerianus Taeger, 1989
 Orgilus fisheri Muesebeck, 1970
 Orgilus frigidus Muesebeck, 1970
 Orgilus fulgens Muesebeck, 1970
 Orgilus fulvus Belokobylskij & Taeger, 1998
 Orgilus galbinus Chou, 1995
 Orgilus gauldi van Achterberg, 1987
 Orgilus geijskesi van Achterberg, 1987
 Orgilus gelechiae (Ashmead, 1889)
 Orgilus gelechiaevora Cushman, 1920
 Orgilus genalis van Achterberg, 1987
 Orgilus genestoermeri Sharkey, 2021
 Orgilus glabratus van Achterberg, 1987
 Orgilus glacialis Muesebeck, 1970
 Orgilus gossypii Muesebeck, 1956
 Orgilus gracilis (Brues, 1908)
 Orgilus gramineus Muesebeck, 1970
 Orgilus grandior (Brues, 1933)
 Orgilus grapholithae Muesebeck, 1970
 Orgilus grunini Tobias, 1986
 Orgilus haeselbarthi Taeger, 1989
 Orgilus hofferi Capek, 1989
 Orgilus huddlestoni Taeger, 1989
 Orgilus hungaricus Szepligeti, 1896
 Orgilus hyalinus Muesebeck, 1970
 Orgilus hybridus Taeger, 1989
 Orgilus ibericus Taeger, 1989
 Orgilus imitator Muesebeck, 1970
 Orgilus immarginatus Muesebeck, 1970
 Orgilus impiger Muesebeck, 1970
 Orgilus improcerus Chou, 1995
 Orgilus indagator Muesebeck, 1967
 Orgilus infrequens Muesebeck, 1970
 Orgilus infumatus Granger, 1949
 Orgilus inopinus Muesebeck, 1970
 Orgilus insularis Muesebeck, 1970
 Orgilus interjectus Taeger, 1989
 Orgilus intermedius Muesebeck, 1970
 Orgilus invictus Muesebeck, 1970
 Orgilus iphigeniae van Achterberg, 1987
 Orgilus ischnus Marshall, 1898
 Orgilus jamesriegeri Sharkey, 2021
 Orgilus jeanmillerae Sharkey, 2021
 Orgilus jeffmilleri Sharkey, 2021
 Orgilus jennieae Marsh, 1979
 Orgilus jerrypowelli Sharkey, 2021
 Orgilus jimtiedjei Sharkey, 2021
 Orgilus johnlundbergi Sharkey, 2021
 Orgilus johnpipolyi Sharkey, 2021
 Orgilus jorgellorentei Sharkey, 2021
 Orgilus kaszabi Taeger, 1991
 Orgilus kumatai Watanabe, 1968
 Orgilus kurentzovi Belokobylskij, 1998
 Orgilus laeviventris (Cresson, 1872)
 Orgilus larryspearsi Sharkey, 2021
 Orgilus lateralis (Cresson, 1872)
 Orgilus lautus Muesebeck, 1970
 Orgilus leleji Belokobylskij & Taeger, 1996
 Orgilus lepidus Muesebeck, 1967
 Orgilus leptocephalus (Hartig, 1838)
 Orgilus levis Muesebeck, 1970
 Orgilus lini Chou, 1995
 Orgilus lissus Muesebeck, 1970
 Orgilus longiceps Muesebeck, 1933
 Orgilus longicornis (Brues, 1933)
 Orgilus lucidus Turner, 1927
 Orgilus luctuosus Taeger, 1987
 Orgilus lunaris Muesebeck, 1970
 Orgilus macrurus Muesebeck, 1970
 Orgilus maculiventris (Cresson, 1872)
 Orgilus magadanicus Belokobylskij, 1998
 Orgilus marlinricei Sharkey, 2021
 Orgilus medicaginis Muesebeck, 1970
 Orgilus mediterraneus Taeger, 1989
 Orgilus meifengensis Chou, 1995
 Orgilus melissopi Muesebeck, 1970
 Orgilus mellipes (Say, 1836)
 Orgilus mellissaespinozae Sharkey, 2021
 Orgilus meyeri Telenga, 1933
 Orgilus mikesmithi Sharkey, 2021
 Orgilus mimicus Muesebeck, 1970
 Orgilus minor Taeger, 1989
 Orgilus minutus Cameron, 1900
 Orgilus minutus Szepligeti, 1898
 Orgilus moczari Papp, 1981
 Orgilus modicus Muesebeck, 1970
 Orgilus moldavicus Tobias, 1986
 Orgilus momphae Muesebeck, 1970
 Orgilus mongolicus Taeger, 1989
 Orgilus monticola Muesebeck, 1970
 Orgilus morulus Muesebeck, 1970
 Orgilus Muesebecki Taeger, 1989
 Orgilus mundus Muesebeck, 1970
 Orgilus neotropicus van Achterberg, 1987
 Orgilus nepalensis Taeger, 1989
 Orgilus niger Penteado-Dias, 1999
 Orgilus nigripennis (Dahl, 1912)
 Orgilus nigromaculatus Cameron, 1906
 Orgilus nitidiceps Taeger, 1989
 Orgilus nitidior Taeger, 1989
 Orgilus nitidus Marshall, 1898
 Orgilus normplatnicki Sharkey, 2021
 Orgilus notabilis Muesebeck, 1970
 Orgilus obesus Taeger, 1989
 Orgilus obscurator (Nees, 1812)
 Orgilus oehlkei Taeger, 1989
 Orgilus opacus Muesebeck, 1970
 Orgilus oregonensis Muesebeck, 1970
 Orgilus ortrudae Taeger, 1989
 Orgilus Pappianus Taeger, 1987
 Orgilus parallelus Muesebeck, 1970
 Orgilus parcus Turner, 1922
 Orgilus parvipennis Thomson, 1895
 Orgilus patzaki Taeger, 1989
 Orgilus pedalis Muesebeck, 1970
 Orgilus perplexus Taeger, 1989
 Orgilus persimilis Muesebeck, 1970
 Orgilus peterrauchi Sharkey, 2021
 Orgilus pimpinellae Niezabitowski, 1910
 Orgilus planus Chou, 1995
 Orgilus podus Braet & van Achterberg, 2001
 Orgilus politus Muesebeck, 1970
 Orgilus ponticus Tobias, 1986
 Orgilus pratensis Muesebeck, 1970
 Orgilus priesneri Fischer, 1958
 Orgilus prolixus Muesebeck, 1970
 Orgilus proprius Muesebeck, 1970
 Orgilus pulcher (Szepligeti, 1905)
 Orgilus pumilus Muesebeck, 1970
 Orgilus punctatus (Beyr, 1959)
 Orgilus punctiventris Tobias, 1976
 Orgilus punctulator (Nees, 1812)
 Orgilus pusillus Szepligeti, 1913
 Orgilus quadricolor Braet & van Achterberg, 2001
 Orgilus radialis Jakimavicius, 1972
 Orgilus rarus Chou, 1995
 Orgilus rasilis Muesebeck, 1970
 Orgilus reclinatus Braet & van Achterberg, 2000
 Orgilus resplendens Taeger, 1989
 Orgilus richardprimacki Sharkey, 2021
 Orgilus rostratus Muesebeck, 1970
 Orgilus rubrator (Ratzeburg, 1852)
 Orgilus rubriceps (Ashmead, 1894)
 Orgilus rudolphae Tobias, 1976
 Orgilus rufigaster Tobias, 1964
 Orgilus rugosus (Nees, 1834)
 Orgilus sandraberriosae Sharkey, 2021
 Orgilus saponariellae Taeger, 1989
 Orgilus sarahmirandae Sharkey, 2021
 Orgilus scottmilleri Sharkey, 2021
 Orgilus scottmorii Sharkey, 2021
 Orgilus setosus van Achterberg, 1987
 Orgilus seyrigi Granger, 1949
 Orgilus Sharkeyi Taeger, 1989
 Orgilus similis Szepligeti, 1896
 Orgilus simillimus Taeger, 1989
 Orgilus simulator Muesebeck, 1970
 Orgilus solidus Muesebeck, 1970
 Orgilus spasskensis Belokobylskij & Taeger, 1996
 Orgilus sticticus Taeger, 1989
 Orgilus striatus Muesebeck, 1970
 Orgilus strigosus Muesebeck, 1970
 Orgilus sudzuchae Belokobylskij & Taeger, 1996
 Orgilus sumatranus (Enderlein, 1912)
 Orgilus swezeyi Fullaway, 1956
 Orgilus szelenyii Papp, 1981
 Orgilus taiwanensis Chou, 1995
 Orgilus temporalis Tobias, 1976
 Orgilus tenuis Muesebeck, 1970
 Orgilus tersus Muesebeck, 1970
 Orgilus thomsoni Taeger, 1989
 Orgilus tibialis (Enderlein, 1912)
 Orgilus Tobiasi Taeger, 1989
 Orgilus transversus van Achterberg, 1987
 Orgilus tristis Taeger, 1989
 Orgilus turgus Papp, 1981
 Orgilus turkmenus Telenga, 1933
 Orgilus utahensis Muesebeck, 1970
 Orgilus validus Muesebeck, 1970
 Orgilus vallis Muesebeck, 1970
 Orgilus vasici Brajkovic, 1987
 Orgilus viduus Taeger, 1989
 Orgilus walleyi Muesebeck, 1970
 Orgilus westermanni (Enderlein, 1912)
 Orgilus woldai van Achterberg, 1987
 Orgilus zonalis Muesebeck, 1970
 Orgilus zuluanus (Turner, 1927)

References

Braconidae
Braconidae genera